The North Manitou Shoal Light, also known as the North Manitou Light or, locally, The Crib, is a lighthouse located in Lake Michigan, southeast of North Manitou Island in Leland Township, Michigan.  When it was automated in 1980, it was the last manned offshore light in the Great Lakes.  It was listed on the National Register of Historic Places in 2005.

History
In 1907, the Lighthouse Board recommended that the shoal north of North Manitou Island be marked with a lightship.  In 1910, Lightship No. 56 was stationed at the site, and continued there until 1927, when it was replaced by Lightship No. 89.  In 1934, Lightship No. 103 was transferred to the location, and stayed until the permanent structure was built the next year.

In 1923, the Lighthouse Board first proposed replacing the lightships with a permanent station. However, funds were not allocated for the purpose until 1933, when they were made available through the Public Works Administration. The station was originally manned by a three-man crew, but in 1980 the light was automated and the station abandoned. The original Westinghouse Airway Beacon light was changed and replaced several times over the years, and is currently a solar and battery powered LED beacon.

in late 2016, the lighthouse was put up for public auction by the General Services Administration. The non-profit North Manitou Light Keepers, Inc. purchased the lighthouse at auction and have undertaken a total restoration of the lighthouse.

Description
The North Manitou Shoal Light Station is a white square steel structure atop a concrete crib. A two-story steel building  square, containing diesel generators and living quarters, sits atop the superstructure, and a three-story steel tower containing the light caps the whole.

References

External links
North Manitou Light Keepers, Inc.
 

Lighthouses completed in 1935
Houses completed in 1935
Lighthouses on the National Register of Historic Places in Michigan
Buildings and structures in Leelanau County, Michigan
National Register of Historic Places in Leelanau County, Michigan